Lupien may refer to:

 Gilles Lupien (1954–2021), Canadian ice hockey player
 Tabitha Lupien (born 1988), Canadian actress and competitive dancer
 Tony Lupien (1917–2004), American baseball player
 Yannick Lupien (born 1980), Canadian freestyle swimmer
 Bill Lupien (1941–2021), American business executive in the financial industry
 Ulysses J. Lupien (1883–1965), American government official and business executive

See also 
 Saint-Lupien, commune in the Aube department in north-central France